Frank Sargeant may refer to:
 Frank Sargeant (author)
 Frank Sargeant (bishop)

See also
 Frank Sargent (disambiguation)